Prócer (Spanish: Hero; plural próceres) may refer to:

Prócer Que Creó Bandera Patria, a nickname for Antonio Vélez Alvarado
Panteón de los Próceres, crypt inside the old Church of the Real Colegio de San Carlos
Gran Centro Los Próceres, shopping complex in Guatemala City, Guatemala
Parque de los Próceres, park in Mayagüez, Puerto Rico
Monumento a los Próceres de la Independencia, see Obelisco (Guatemala City)
Paseo Los Próceres (Walk of the Heroes), in Caracas, Venezuela
Columna a los próceres del 9 de octubre (Column of the heroes of the October 9) a monument in Guayaquil
Estamento de próceres, a Senate-like institution outlined in the Spanish Royal Statute of 1834

See also
Procer (disambiguation)
Libertadores in Latin American wars of independence